This is a list of unincorporated communities in the U.S. state of Washington which are not incorporated municipalities. Incorporated municipalities in the state are listed separately in a list of cities and list of towns. Due to unreliability of the source data in the Geographic Names Information System, items in this list may be historical places that no longer exist, places that are part of an incorporated city or town or a CDP, or never a community in the first place.

Census-designated places 

There are 345 unincorporated communities that are treated as "places" for the purpose of U.S. Census Bureau data collection. These are termed census-designated places (CDPs) and are listed on a separate page.

Unincorporated communities (including those that are CDPs)

References

Washington

Unincorporated Communities